Dust and Bones may refer to:

 "Dust and Bones", an episode from season 13 of the television show Criminal Minds
 Dust and Bones, the debut solo album by Cary Ann Hearst
 "Dust N' Bones", a song by Guns N' Roses on the album Use Your Illusion I
 Of Dust and Bones, a film directed by Diane Bell